The 1958 Sylvania Television Awards were presented on January 22, 1959, at the Plaza Hotel in New York City. The Sylvania Awards were established by Sylvania Electric Products.

The 31-member panel that decided the winners was chaired by Deems Taylor and also included Marvin Barrett, television editor of Newsweek; Kenneth Bartlett of Syracuse University; pitcher Bob Feller; Judge Samuel S. Leibowitz; actor and playwright Elliott Nugent; actress and author Cornelius Oits Skinner; and lawyer and writer Telford Taylor.

Nominees
The programs nominated for "Outstanding Telecast" included The Plot to Kill Stalin; the Moiseyev Dancers on The Ed Sullivan Show; An Evening with Fred Astaire; Little Moon of Alban; All the King's Men on Kraft Television Theatre; The Bridge of San Luis Rey on DuPont Show of the Month; and the episode "African Adventure" from Lowell Thomas's High Adventure.

The nominees for outstanding actor included Paul Muni in The Last Clear Chance; Melvyn Douglas in The Plot to Kill Stalin; Neville Brand in All the King's Men; and Frederic March in The Winslow Boy.

The nominees for outstanding actress included Rosalind Russell in Wonderful Town; Piper Laurie in Days of Wine and Roses; Julie Harris in Little Moon of Alban; and Judith Anderson and Viveca Lindfors in The Bridge on San Luis Rey.

Winners
The winners were:
 Outstanding telecast - Little Moon of Alban, Hallmark Hall of Fame (NBC)
 Outstanding dramatic program - Little Moon of Alban
 Outstanding performance by an actress - Julie Harris for Little Moon of Alban
 Outstanding performance by an actor - Neville Brand, All the King's Men
 Best supporting performance by an actress - Maureen Stapleton, All the King's Men
 Best supporting performance by an actor - Oscar Homolka as Nikita Khrushchev in The Plot to Kill Stalin, Playhouse 90
 Original original teleplay - James Costigan, Little Moon of Alban
 Outstanding variety show - Bob Hope's Moscow show
 Outstanding comedy show - The Sid Caesar Show
 Light musical show - An Evening with Fred Astaire
 Outstanding documentary program - The Face of Red China (CBS) and coverage of the coronation of Pope John XXIII (CBS)
 Outstanding documentary series - The Twentieth Century
 Outstanding news and special events program - live telecast of the Explorer launch (NBC)
 Outstanding contributions to serious music in television - Leonard Bernstein for programs on two networks
 Best comedy writing - John Vlahos for The Beaver Patrol, U.S. Steel Hour
 TV adaptation - Ludi Claire for The Bridge of San Luis Rey
 Outstanding children's program - Art Carney Meets Peter and the Wolf
 Outstanding public service program - NBC's Continental Classroom
 Merit citation - Rome Eternal on the Catholic Hour
 Outstanding religious series - Frontiers of Faith, Catholic Hour, and Eternal Light''

References

Sylvania Awards